Dylan Alcott and Heath Davidson defeated the defending champions Andrew Lapthorne and David Wagner in the final, 6–0, 6–7(5–7), [10–6] to win the quad doubles wheelchair tennis title at the 2018 Australian Open.

Seeds

Draw

References
 Main Draw

Wheelchair Quad Doubles
2018 Quad Doubles